Western Alamance High School is a public, coeducational high school located in Elon, North Carolina. It is one of seven high schools in the Alamance-Burlington School System. The school runs on block scheduling from 8:45am to 3:45pm. Its mission is to challenge students' capabilities, while maintaining an environment that preaches respect, innovation, and care for others.

Athletics 
Western Alamance is classified as a 3A school by the North Carolina High School Athletic Association and is a member of the Triad 3A Conference.

The Warriors' football team went to the finals of the state championship four consecutive years, from 2004 to 2007. They won the 2007 state championship on December 8, 2007, 62–36 against North Gaston High School. The Championship win was the first for the school's football program under long-time coach Hal Capps. The Field-house has been named in Coach Capps's honor.

On March 10, 2010, Jeff Snuffer, an 18-yr. veteran assistant coach, was named the new Head Coach of the Western Alamance Warriors, succeeding Coach Capps.

Western Alamance also has 2A State Championships in Men's Tennis (1994, 1998, 1999, 2000) and Men's Golf (2001).

Western Alamance also has had individual 3A state champions in Women's Track and Field: Lydia Laws 2012 300m Hurdles (44.84), 2013 300m Hurdles (43.79); and Alexis Dickerson 2013 Shot Put (39–8.25).

Western Alamance also has had individual 3A state champions in Men's Track and Field: Scott Grell 1987 110m Hurdles (14.6) and 300m Hurdles (37.8 3A state record time); Eric Sellars 1990 Pole Vault (13–6); Albert Royster 1992 800m (1:54.93 3A state record time)

Notable alumni 

Mitchell Gornto, scholarship gymnast and student-athlete at The University of Michigan
 Frank Haith, head men's basketball coach at the University of Tulsa
 A'Darius Pegues, professional basketball player

References 

Public high schools in North Carolina
Schools in Alamance County, North Carolina